Association Sportive Tiare Tahiti, is a football club from 'Āfareaitu, in the island of Moorea. It currently competes at Tahiti Ligue 1.  The club name is a reference of Gardenia taitensis, the national flower of French Polynesia. They were accepted as the Moorea representants in Ligue 1, after finishing on top of the Ligue 2 Moorea in 2017–18.

Current squad
Squad for the 2019–20 Tahiti Ligue 1

Achievements
Ligue 2 Moorea
Champions (7): 2005–06, 2006–07, 2008–09, 2013–14, 2015–16, 2016–17, 2017–18
Tahiti Ligue 1 Runners-up'' (1): 2018–19

Last seasons

Continental record

References

Football clubs in French Polynesia
Football clubs in Mo'orea
1968 establishments in French Polynesia
Association football clubs established in 1968